Hyperolius albofrenatus is a species of frog in the family Hyperoliidae.
It is endemic to Tanzania.
Its natural habitats are rivers, freshwater marshes, and intermittent freshwater marshes.

References

albofrenatus
Amphibians described in 1931
Taxonomy articles created by Polbot